Alexander Findlay may refer to:
Alexander Findlay (politician) (1844–1921), Scottish politician
Alexander Findlay (British Army officer) (fl. 1820s and 1830s), British Army officer and colonial governor
Alexander George Findlay (1812–1875), English geographer and hydrographer
Alexander Findlay, prisoner on St. Michael of Scarborough

See also
Alex Finlay, Australian politician
Alexander Struthers Finlay (1807–1886), Scottish politician